Bezmer Point (Nos Bezmer \'nos bez-'mer\) is on the northwest coast of the Varna Peninsula on Livingston Island in the South Shetland Islands, Antarctica.  The point is situated 9.6 km east-northeast of Siddins Point and 3 km southwest of Kotis Point and 4.9 km west-southwest of Miziya Peak.  The feature was named after the settlement of Bezmer in Southeastern Bulgaria, in association with the Bulgarian ruler Khan Bezmer (7th Century AD).

Location

Maps
 L.L. Ivanov et al. Antarctica: Livingston Island and Greenwich Island, South Shetland Islands. Scale 1:100000 topographic map. Sofia: Antarctic Place-names Commission of Bulgaria, 2005.
 L.L. Ivanov. Antarctica: Livingston Island and Greenwich, Robert, Snow and Smith Islands. Scale 1:120000 topographic map.  Troyan: Manfred Wörner Foundation, 2009.

References
 Bezmer Point. SCAR Composite Gazetteer of Antarctica
 Bulgarian Antarctic Gazetteer. Antarctic Place-names Commission. (details in Bulgarian, basic data in English)

External links
 Bezmer Point. Copernix satellite image

Headlands of Livingston Island